Interstate business routes are roads connecting a central or commercial district of a city or town with an Interstate bypass. These roads typically follow along local streets often along a former U.S. Route or state highway that had been replaced by an Interstate. Interstate business route reassurance markers are signed as either loops or spurs using a green shield shaped sign and numbered like the shield of the parent Interstate highway.

Along Interstate 55 (I-55), there are a total of six business routes, three in both Missouri and Illinois, all which are business loops.

New Madrid business loop

Interstate 55 Business (I-55 Bus.) is a major arterial surface street that serves downtown New Madrid, Missouri. It runs north from I-55 at exit 44 and the overlap of U.S. Route 61 (US 61)/US 62 through downtown to exit 49 on I-55.

Cape Girardeau business loop

Interstate 55 Business (I-55 Bus.) begins at US 61/Route 74 in Cape Girardeau at exit 93 and ends at US 61 at exit 105 in Fruitland. However, it also crosses its parent Interstate at exit 99

Crystal City business loop

Interstate 55 Business (I-55 Bus.) spans from US 67/US 61 at exit 174 in Crystal City to McNutt Street at exit 178 in Herculaneum.

Springfield business loop

Interstate 55 Business (I-55 Bus.) is to a major arterial surface street that serves downtown Springfield, Illinois. It runs north from the intersection of I-55 and I-72 through downtown to Illinois Route 4 (IL 4, Veterans' Parkway). It then runs northeast to Sherman.

All of I-55 Bus. was part of US 66 at some point.

Major junctions

Lincoln business loop

Interstate 55 Business (I-55 Bus.) services the downtown of Lincoln, Illinois. It begins southwest of Lincoln and follows the former US 66 to Fifth Street. It then turns east on Fifth Street, southeast on Clinton Street, and northeast on Kickapoo Street at the city's center. The route continues northeast to rejoin the former routing of US 66 northeast of town near the Logan County Airport, at which point it continues along that route to end at I-55 further northeast of Lincoln.

Bloomington–Normal business loop

Interstate 55 Business (I-55 Bus.) in Bloomington–Normal is known for its entire length as Veterans Parkway. It is a divided, limited-access highway bypassing the Bloomington–Normal area to the south and east. The route's north–south portion largely passes through a retail core, including Eastland Mall and The Shoppes at College Hills. The highway is also the recommended route from I-39, I-55, and I-74 to Central Illinois Regional Airport via IL 9.

Major junctions

References

Interstate 55
55